Quesada Quesada is a municipality in the Jutiapa department of Guatemala.

Municipalities of the Jutiapa Department